Uysky District is an administrative and municipal district (raion), one of the twenty-seven in Chelyabinsk Oblast, Russia. It is located in the west of the oblast. Its administrative center is the rural locality (a selo) of Uyskoye. Population:  28,555 (2002 Census);  The population of Uyskoye accounts for 28.1% of the district's total population.

References

Notes

Sources

Districts of Chelyabinsk Oblast